John Joseph Poirier (born July 30, 1937) was an all-star and Grey Cup champion football player in the CFL for twelve years with the Ottawa Rough Riders.

He played as a defensive back for the Riders and was a part of three Grey Cup winning teams and was a 5-time Eastern all-star. He never missed a game in the 12 years he played.

References

1939 births
Living people
Canadian football defensive backs
Canadian Football League Rookie of the Year Award winners
McGill Redbirds football players
Ottawa Rough Riders players
People from Verdun, Quebec
Players of Canadian football from Quebec
Canadian football people from Montreal